The Xianning Nuclear Power Plant, also named Dafan Nuclear Power Plant (大畈核电站), is planned in Dafan Town, Tongshan County, Xianning, Hubei Province, China. It is planned to host at least four 1,250-megawatt (MW) AP1000 pressurized water reactors.

The plant is owned by Hubei Nuclear Power Company, a joint venture of China Guangdong Nuclear Power Group (CGNPC) and Hubei Energy Group Ltd. 
The cost of four AP1000 reactors is put at CNY 60 billion (US$8.8 billion). 
Work on the site began in 2010; the first reactor was planned to start construction in 2011 and go online in 2015.
However, construction of the first phase has yet to start as of 2018.

Reactors

The plant is described as the first nuclear power plant to be built in China's inland regions (i.e., not near the sea coast). The plant is expected to use the water of the Fushui Reservoir for cooling and various ancillary purposes.

Transportation access
There are no railways or navigable waterways within the station's vicinity. (The Fushui River is not navigable). In order to facilitate the delivery of heavy equipment (such as the reactor pressure vessels or electric generators) to the construction site, a major highway construction and upgrade project is being undertaken. The so-called Xianning Nuclear Plant Site Large Equipment Transport Road will connect the station's construction site with the Panjiawan Harbor on the Yangtze River in Jiayu County.

See also

Nuclear power in China

References

External links 
 咸宁核电有限公司 (Xianning Nuclear Power Ltd.)  - company's official site

Nuclear power stations in China
Power stations in Hubei
Nuclear power stations using AP1000 reactors
Proposed nuclear power stations
Proposed power stations in China